Parmouti 27 - Coptic Calendar - Parmouti 29

The twenty-eighth day of the Coptic month of Parmouti, the eighth month of the Coptic year. In common years, this day corresponds to April 23, of the Julian Calendar, and May 6, of the Gregorian Calendar. This day falls in the Coptic Season of Shemu, the season of the Harvest.

Commemorations

Martyrs 

 The martyrdom of Saint Milius the Ascetic

References 

Days of the Coptic calendar